Agelasta mindanaonis is a species of beetle in the family Cerambycidae. It was described by Stephan von Breuning in 1939. It is known from the Philippines.

References

mindanaonis
Beetles described in 1939